Omok is an extinct Yukaghir language of Siberia, part of a dialect continuum with the two surviving languages. It was last spoken perhaps as late as the 18th century.

References 

Yukaghir languages
Extinct languages of Asia
Languages extinct in the 18th century